Grube may refer to:

 Grube, a municipality in Schleswig-Holstein, Germany
 German name of Fouchy, a commune in Alsace, France
 Grube (Weser), a river of North Rhine-Westphalia, Germany
 Grube (Wismar), a river of Mecklenburg-Vorpommern, Germany
 Grube (surname)